Mark Hildreth (born 24 January 1978) is a Canadian actor appearing in movie and television roles. A graduate of The National Theatre School of Canada, Mark Hildreth's theater credits include Hamlet (The Shakespeare Project), Bertram in All's Well that Ends Well (Bard on the Beach), Richard of Gloucester in Richard III (NTSC) and Cale Blackwell in Fire (Teatre Lac Brome). He also starred as Pastor Tom Hale in the ABC drama Resurrection.

Life and career
Active as an actor since 1986, Hildreth has provided voiceovers since the age of 10, when he was cast as the voice of Beany in DiC Entertainment's production of Beany and Cecil. Since then, major roles have included: Caz in The New Adventures of He-Man, Alex Mann in Action Man; Hi-Tech in the direct-to-video CGI animated movies G.I. Joe: Spy Troops and G.I. Joe: Valor vs. Venom; Quicksilver in Wolverine and the X-Men; Terry Bogard in the Fatal Fury series; Oberon in "A Midsummer Night's Dream"; Harrison in Stargate: Infinity; and Heero Yuy in Gundam Wing.

He provided voices for enemy soldiers for the video game Metal Gear Solid 4: Guns of the Patriots, and for the character DJ Atomika in SSX 3, SSX Blur, SSX (2012 video game), and Burnout Paradise.

Hildreth also appears in stage productions:  In 2001, Hildreth played the role of Eugene Marchbanks in the Vancouver Playhouse production of George Bernard Shaw's Candida, for which he received a Jessie Richardson award for best performance by an actor in a leading role.

In 2003, he joined the band Davis Trading as a keyboardist and singer. Hildreth left Davis Trading in 2004 to go solo; he formed his own band with guitarist Jory Neal Groberman and drummer Amrit Basi. He writes and sings all original music. In 2008, he released an album titled "Complex State of Attachment." In December 2012, he released his second album, "Signs of Life".

He appeared in the ABC-TV series V as Joshua, and Cartoon Network's Hot Wheels Battle Force 5 as Vert Wheeler.

Personal life
Hildreth was a member of NXIVM for over 10 years. He, along with Allison Mack led NXIVM's artist and acting program known as “The Source” as the 12-week program leader. Hildreth reportedly left the organization between 2016 and 2017 upon finding out about the DOS branding of women in NXIVM.

Filmography

 Love Is Never Silent (1985) — Bradley Ryder Riders
 The Humanoid (1986) — Eric 
 The New Adventures of Beans Baxter (1987) — Beazle 
 After the Promise (1987) — Raymond (age 8) 
 The New Adventures of Beany and Cecil (1988) — Beany 
 Camp Candy (1989) — Additional Voices 
 The New Adventures of He-Man (1990) — Caz 
 My Son Johnny (1991) — Johnny Age 12 
 The Odyssey (1992) — Finger 
 King Arthur and the Knights of Justice (1992) — Sir Zeke/Squire Everett 
 The Bots Master (1993) — Ziv 'ZZ' Zulander 
 Relentless: Mind of a Killer (1993) — Jeremy 
 Hurricanes (1993) — Ingred 
 The Odyssey (1994) — Finger, Mick 
 Fatal Fury: Legend of the Hungry Wolf (1994) — Terry Bogard
 Kishin Corps: Alien Defender Geo-Armor (1994) — Jack 
 Madison (1994) — Allan 
 Conan and the Young Warriors (1994) — Additional Voices 
 Shock Treatment (1995) — Craig Grant 
 Street Fighter: The Animated Series (1995) TV Series (voice) — Thrasher's victim, Mad Gear gang members, Additional voices 
 Action Man (1995) TV Series – Additional Voices 
 Hawkeye (1995) — Gabriel 
 Fatal Fury 2: The New Battle (1995) — Terry Bogard
 Fatal Fury: The Motion Picture (1995) — Terry Bogard
 Please Save My Earth (1996) — Issei Nishikiyori 
 Dragon Ball Z (1989) — Dr. Briefs/Additional Voices (Ocean Group dub)  (1996–1997)
 Billy the Cat (1996) — Additional Voices 
 Vor-Tech: Undercover Conversion Squad (1996) — Additional Voices 
 Past Perfect (1996) — Rusty Walker 
 Honey, I Shrunk the Kids: The TV Show (1998) — Jack McKenna 
 Stories From My Childhood (1998) — Various Characters 
 Past Perfect (1998) — Rusty Walker 
 Hope Island (1999) — Mark 
 Y2K (1999/II) (TV) — Young Soldier No. 2 
 Level 9 (2000) — Raymo 
 Call of the Wild (2000) TV Series – Stanton 
 Action Man (2000) TV Series (voice) — Alex Mann 
 Mobile Suit Gundam Wing (2000) TV Series (voice) — Heero Yuy 
 Andromeda (2000) — Brendan Lahey
 Gundam Wing: Endless Waltz (2000) (TV) (voice) — Heero Yuy 
 What About Mimi? (2000) TV Series (voice) — Kyle, Additional Voices 
 Madeline (2000) TV Series – Additional Voices 
 Donner (2001) (TV) — Dasher, Dancer 
 Wolf Lake (2001) (TV) — Billy 
 UC: Undercover (2001) TV Series – Danny 
 Night Visions (2001) TV Series – Tim 
 Just Cause (2001) TV Series – Ted Kasselbaum 
 Mary-Kate and Ashley in Action! (2001) TV Series – Additional Voices 
 Ultimate Book of Spells (2001) TV Series – Additional Voices 
 Gundam: Battle Assault 2 (2002) — Heero Yuy 
 Stargate: Infinity (2002) TV Series – R.J. Harrison 
 Barbie as Rapunzel (2002) — Stefan 
 They (2002) — Troy 
 No Night Is Too Long (2002) — James Gilman 
 G.I. Joe: Spy Troops (2003) — High-Tech 
 Barbie of Swan Lake (2003) — Prince Daniel 
 Sabrina's Secret Life (2003) — Additional Voices 
 Gadget and the Gadgetinis (2003) — Additional Voices 
 Taken (2003) — Ten. Wailey
 The Cramp Twins (2003) — Additional Voices 
 SSX 3 (2003) - Video game - DJ Atomika (voice)
 Battle Assault 3 Featuring Gundam Seed (2004) — Heero Yuy 
 Dragons: Fire and Ice (2004) — Prince Dev 
 G.I. Joe: Valor vs. Venom (2004) — Hi-Tech 
 Barbie as the Princess and the Pauper (2004) — Dominic 
 Legend of Earthsea (2004) — Jasper 
 My Scene: Jammin' in Jamaica (2004) — Sutton 
 Everyone (2004) — Grant 
 Eighteen (2004/I) — Macauley 
 Krypto the Superdog (2005) TV Series – Additional Voices 
 The Collector (2005) TV Series – Sickert 
 Young Blades (2005) TV Series – Siroc 
 My Scene Goes Hollywood: The Movie (2005) — Sutton (voice) 
 Marvel Nemesis: Rise of the Imperfects (2005) Video Game — Daredevil 
 Dragons II: The Metal Ages (2005) Video Game – Dev 
 Barbie and the Magic of Pegasus 3-D (2005) — Aiden (voice) 
 This Space for Rent (2006) TV Series – River Sorenson 
 Class of the Titans (2006) TV Series – Phil/Pan (voice) 
 Falcon Beach (2007) TV Series – Hal Massey 
 Company of Heroes: Opposing Fronts (2007) — Roy Jones 
 Medieval II: Total War: Kingdoms (2007) Video Game 
 Pirates of the Caribbean: At World's End (2007) Movie – Cryer 
 Burnout Paradise (2008) Video Game – DJ Atomika (voice) 
 Pirates of the Caribbean: At World's End (2008) Video Game — Davy Jones 
 Metal Gear Solid 4: Guns of the Patriots (2008) — Soldiers
 Wolverine and the X-Men (2008) — Quicksilver 
 Eureka (2008) — Chuck 
 Barbie and the Three Musketeers (2009) — Prince Louis 
 Supernatural (2009) — Adam Benson 
 Being Erica (2009) — Mr. Leeds 
 The Tudors (2009) — Reginald Pole 
 Dragon Age: Origins (2009) Video Game – Sten 
 V (2009) TV Series – Joshua 
 Planet Hulk (2010) — Red King 
 Hot Wheels Battle Force 5 (2010) — Vert Wheeler/Praxion/Kyrosys/Ramble 
 Voltron Force (2011) — King Lotor 
 SSX (2012) — Dj Atomika (voice) 
 The Bureau: XCOM Declassified (2013) Video Game — Agent William Carter 
 End of the World (2013) — Max 
 Resurrection (2014) TV series — Pastor Tom Hale 
 Hulk and the Agents of S.M.A.S.H. (2014) TV series — Deathlok
 Transformers: Robots in Disguise (2015) TV series — Scowl
 The Hollow (2018) TV series — The Weird Guy
 Escaping the Madhouse: The Nellie Bly Story (2019) – Bartholemew Driscoll

References

External links
 Official website
 

Living people
Canadian male child actors
Canadian male film actors
Canadian impressionists (entertainers)
Canadian male television actors
Canadian male video game actors
Canadian male voice actors
Male actors from Vancouver
20th-century Canadian male actors
21st-century Canadian male actors
1978 births